Joseph Michael Jurevicius (born December 23, 1974) is a former American football wide receiver. He was drafted by the New York Giants in the second round of the 1998 NFL Draft. He played college football at Penn State.

Jurevicius played for the Giants, Tampa Bay Buccaneers, Seattle Seahawks, and Cleveland Browns. He earned a Super Bowl ring with the Buccaneers in Super Bowl XXXVII, and also played in Super Bowl XXXV and Super Bowl XL as a member of the Giants and Seahawks respectively.

Early years
Jurevicius attended St. Justin Martyr School in Eastlake, Ohio, and Lake Catholic High School in Mentor, Ohio, and was a letterman in football as a wide receiver and punter, and in basketball, his #84 jersey is retired and hanging in the Lake Catholic gymnasium.

College career
Jurevicius played college football at Penn State University under head coach Joe Paterno. He finished his college career with 94 receptions for 1,905 yards and 15 touchdowns.

Professional career

New York Giants
Jurevicius was selected by the New York Giants in the second round (55th overall) in the 1998 NFL Draft. He played four seasons with the New York Giants through the 2002 season. During his time in New York, he played in 58 games, scoring five touchdowns and totaling 1,442 receiving yards. He played in the Giants' 34–7 loss to the Baltimore Ravens in Super Bowl XXXV, but did not record any receptions.

Tampa Bay Buccaneers
In 2002, Jurevicius signed a four-year contract with the Tampa Bay Buccaneers as an unrestricted free agent. In the 2002 NFC Championship game against the Philadelphia Eagles, he took a crossing pattern 71 yards down to the Eagles' five-yard line. In Super Bowl XXXVII, Jurevicius was the game's leading receiver with four catches for 78 yards as Tampa Bay won by a score of 48–21 over the Oakland Raiders. Tampa Bay is the first franchise from the NFC South to win the Super Bowl.

Jurevicius left Tampa Bay following the 2004 season. He played in 30 games for the team, recording 874 yards receiving and eight touchdowns.

Seattle Seahawks
In 2005, Jurevicius signed with the Seattle Seahawks. He finished the regular season with a career-high 10 touchdowns with 694 receiving yards, leading the team in touchdowns and finishing second in yards. He also had a career-high 137 yards against the St. Louis Rams. He led the Seahawks in receiving with five catches for 93 yards in their 21–10 loss to the Pittsburgh Steelers in Super Bowl XL.

Cleveland Browns
On March 11, 2006, Jurevicius signed a four-year contract with his hometown team, the Cleveland Browns. He became an immediate impact player as a dependable, sure-handed receiver—especially on 3rd-and-long situations. He finished the 2007 season with the third most 3rd-down receptions (29) in the league.

In 2008, Jurevicius spent the preseason recovering from surgery on his right knee. Shortly after the initial surgery, he developed a staph infection and underwent five additional surgeries to eliminate the infection. He began the season on the Active/PUP list, and on August 25, he was transferred to the Reserve/PUP list, forcing him to miss the first six weeks of the regular season. Slow recovery prevented his availability before Week 10, which by NFL rules, made him ineligible to return for the remainder of the 2008 season. He was awarded the team's Ed Block Courage Award, given to the player who best persevered through injury.

Jurevicius underwent a seventh surgery to clear out scar tissue in late 2008, vowing to return for the 2009 season. However, the Browns released him on March 11, 2009.

On June 26, 2009, Jurevicius filed a lawsuit in Cuyahoga County Court of Common Pleas naming the Browns, the Cleveland Clinic, and Browns team physicians, Dr. Anthony Miniaci and Dr. Richard Figler, as defendants. The suit alleged Jurevicius contracted staph in his right knee due to the Browns' failure to sterilize their Berea, Ohio training facility properly and the failure of doctors at the Cleveland Clinic to take proper precautions against infection. Five other Browns players and two staff members had contracted staph since 2003. The Browns and Cleveland Clinic confidentially settled with Jurevicius in 2010.

Retirement
The damage done to his knee effectively forced him into retirement. He now appears on the Tailgate Show on Cleveland Browns pre-game television. Jurevicius also appeared on two episodes of North American Hunter in 2013 hunting moose and bear in Newfoundland and British Columbia.

In 2014, he opted to receive stem cell therapy on his knees.

Personal life
Jurevicius currently lives in Nebraska. He is of Lithuanian descent, and has a tattoo of Vytis, the national symbol of Lithuania on his right biceps. He earned a degree in Human Development and Family Studies from Penn State University in 1997. He appeared on the cover of Sports Illustrated twice: August 25, 1997 and February 3, 2003.

Jurevicius is an avid hunter. In 2007, he co-founded Dismal River Outfitters, a hunting ranch and resort in Mullen, Nebraska, with his former Buccaneer and Seahawk teammate, John Howell. His appearance on 'North American Hunter' chasing moose and spot-and-stalk bear is a further testament to his love of hunting and the outdoors.

In June 2009, Jurevicius took part in the 2009 NFL/NFLPA "Broadcast Boot Camp," a program designed by the NFL Broadcasting Department and their broadcast partners to prepare players for possible post-playing careers in broadcasting.

In September 2018, Jurevicius was robbed at gunpoint in his house in Gates Mills, Ohio. The robber Robert Howse, who was 24 years old at the time, was later found guilty of charges relating to the robbery and received a 43-year prison sentence. The defendant had a notable outburst at his sentencing.

Jurevicius owns a commercial cleaning and laundry businesses headquartered outside of Cleveland.

References

External links
Cleveland Browns biography
Former Buc Jurevicius recalls triumph, tragedy 10 years later, The Tampa Tribune, December 9, 2012.

1974 births
Living people
American football wide receivers
American hunters
American people of Lithuanian descent
American sports businesspeople
Cleveland Browns players
New York Giants players
Penn State Nittany Lions football players
People from Gates Mills, Ohio
Players of American football from Cleveland
Seattle Seahawks players
Tampa Bay Buccaneers players
Ed Block Courage Award recipients